The Michigan Kid is a 1947 American Cinecolor Western film directed by Ray Taylor and starring Jon Hall, Victor McLaglen, Rita Johnson, and Andy Devine.

It was Hall's first film after getting out of the army and filming began 15 April 1946.

Plot
A former U.S. marshal (Jon Hall) rescues an instant heiress (Rita Johnson) from an outlaw's (Victor McLaglen) gang.

Cast
 Jon Hall as Michigan Kid / Jim Rowen
 Victor McLaglen as Curley Davis
 Rita Johnson as Sue Dawson
 Andy Devine as Buster
 Joan Shawlee as Soubrette
 William Ching as Steve Randolph Prescott (as William Brooks)
 Stanley Andrews as Sheriff of Rawhide
 Byron Foulger as Mr. Porter
 Milburn Stone as Lanny Slade
 Leonard East as Dave Boyd
 Charles Trowbridge as Banker John Nash
 Griff Barnett as Prentiss Dawson
 Dewey Robinson as Bartender 
 Ray Teal as Sergeant

References

External links

The Michigan Kid at TCMDB

1947 films
1947 Western (genre) films
American Western (genre) films
Universal Pictures films
Films directed by Ray Taylor
Films scored by Hans J. Salter
Films based on works by Rex Beach
Remakes of American films
Sound film remakes of silent films
1940s English-language films
1940s American films